Herzogianthaceae is a family of liverworts belonging to the order Ptilidiales. The family consists of only one genus: Herzogianthus R.M.Schust..

The genus name of Herzogianthus is in honour of Theodor Carl Julius Herzog (1880– 1961), who was a German bryologist and phytogeographer.

The genus was circumscribed by Rudolf Mathias Schuster in J. Hattori Bot. Lab. vol.23 on page 71 in 1961.

References

Ptilidiales
Liverwort genera